Maria, Mirabela  is a live-action/animated film jointly produced by Romanian and Soviet movie studios. The Romanian premiere took place on December 21, 1981 in Bucharest, The Soviet premiere took place on March 3, 1982 in Moscow.

Maria, Mirabela (1981)

Plot 
Oache, a frog meets old acquaintances: a butterfly, Omide and a fire-fly, Scăpărici. Together they watch two girls playing in a meadow, Maria and Mirabela. Oache remembers an adventure when they all first met each other, and Oache begins to tell the story.

The story begins with Oache meeting the Fairy of the Forest who stopped to drink fresh water at his spring. He is surprised to receive thanks from the Fairy for the good water and, being impressed by the visit, he asserts that frogs are not good for anything. In punishment for the lie, the Fairy of the Forest freezes Oache's legs in the stream.

Two sisters playing with a ball, Maria and Mirabela come across Oache whose legs are frozen and decide to help him. They are helped by Oache's friends, a bunch of funny frogs. They cheerfully dance and melt the ice around Oache, then the girls take Oache with the remaining ice with them. They want to go to the Fairy of the Forest to cure and release Oache.

On the way to the Fairy the girls meet other fantastic beings who need help. They meet Scăpărici, a fire-fly whose shoes cannot glow because when he lights them, they set on fire. Then they meet the King of Caterpillars whose daughter Omide becomes a beautiful butterfly, but she is too afraid to fly.

The girls must get to the Fairy of the Forest before midnight, but time is running out. They visit the strict Lord of Time who does not want to stop the time for them for 5 minutes, so Maria and Mirabella sing a lullaby to him so that he can fall asleep, and time can be stopped. But, the sleeping lord had his arm on Maria's dress, therefore Mirabela hurries to the fairy by herself. But when she reaches the destination, it appears that when the time stopped, the Fairy of the Forest and all of her fantastic companions, including the 4 Seasons, have fallen asleep as well.

After the time starts again the awaken Fairy is surprised to see that the old natural order has been disrupted and, as a consequence, the order of the seasons changed, Summer falling asleep near Winter. Because of that the Seasons got a serious cold, therefore the Fairy needs hot tea to cure them. But there is no water available in her kitchen. In order to prepare the medical tea to cure the sick Seasons, the Fairy gets help from the girls who run to Oache's springs. And there Oache helps them to choose the right source with the purest water. As soon as Oache understands that he can be useful, the ice on his feet thaws like magic. Maria and Mirabela then go to prepare the tea, but they have no matches to light the stove. They are helped by Scăpărici, setting fire to the stove, but his shoes start to burn. Being worried for Scăpărici, the butterfly Omide flies up and extinguishes the flames with her wings. Mirabela helped by the Fairy gives Scăpărici new shiny shoes.

The final song tells how it is fine to live when friends are near. After that it appears that the adventure was all a girls' dream, the Fairy of the Forest turns into their mother, and the Lord of Time into their father.

Production 

The film starred Romanian actors Gilda Manolescu (Maria), Medeea Marinescu (Mirabela), Ingrid Celia (Fairy of the Forest) and the film director, Ion Popescu Gopo (Lord of Time). Musical lyrics were written Grigore Vieru and translated into Russian by Valentin Berestov and Eugene Agranovici. Music was composed by Eugen Doga and performed by Romanian Radio and Television Orchestra, conducted by Cornel Popescu. The songs were sung in Romanian by Anda Călugăreanu, Mihai Constantinescu, Alexandrina Halic, Paula Radulescu, Adrian Stefanescu and Vocal Group 5T. Russian songs were performed by Leonid Serebrennikov.

Gopo used 4 main live action characters (excluding the 4 girls who represent the seasons) and some puppets at first in a real décor. Later the puppets were cut from the movie and in were replaced by some animated characters and also many part of decorum about 80% became based on drawings. The beginning of the movie is entirely animated, but the ending is almost entirely live action.  There were also many other minor unnamed animated characters. It was a capo opera for animations.

A soundtrack of the Soviet version was authored by Dan Ionescu and Vladimir Kutuzov and character animation was done by Boris Kotov. Editors were V. Istrate, M. Gaspar, and N. Savicev.

Maria, Mirabela in Tranzistoria 
The sequel of Maria, Mirabela, this film of 1989 continues the adventures of Maria and Mirabela, this time in an imaginary world inside the TV. Along with the characters played by actors in this movie and three animated characters appear: Oache, Scăpărici and Omide, which symbolize the three vital elements of nature: water, fire and air, without which there is no life on earth. They turn into humans and interpreted by live actors.

The film starred Ioana Moraru, Stela Popescu and Andrianu Kuchinska. Additional crew includes co-director Vladimir Pekar, art directors Tatyana Kolyusheva, Constantin Simionescu, and assistant art director Sergey Mavrody. The film is a Romanian-Soviet co-production made by the Romanian Casa de Filme studio in collaboration with the Soviet Soyuzmultfilm animation studio.

Awards 
 Best music award, by composer Eugen Doga, by Filmmakers Association of Romania (ACIN), 1981 
 Honorary achievement award to Alexandru Popescu, Filmmakers Association of Romania (ACIN), 1981
 Special Mention of the Jury at the 1981 Film Festival in Athens.
 Special prize and diploma in the 1982 All-Union Festival of Children's Films in Tallinn, Estonia
 The Grand prize at the Festival of Children's Films in Piatra Neamt, Romania. 1982 
 Prize for the animation/live action combination at the Festival in Chicago, USA. 1984
 Honorary Mention at the Festival in Quito, Ecuador. 1986
 Prize at the International Film Festival in Giffoni, Italy. 1989

References

External links 
New York Times
Labirint shop overview
Nashe Kino

Maria, Mirabela on animator.ru
 Composer Eugen Doga

1981 films
Films directed by Ion Popescu-Gopo
1981 multilingual films
Soviet animated films
1980s children's fantasy films
1980s Romanian-language films
Films with live action and animation
Romanian animated films
Romanian children's films
Soyuzmultfilm
Soviet multilingual films
1981 animated films
Romanian multilingual films
1980s children's animated films
Films based on fairy tales